Dakota College at Bottineau (DCB) is a public community college in Bottineau, North Dakota. Founded in 1906 as a forestry school, Dakota College's 35-acre campus is home to the North Dakota Forest Service Headquarters. It offers Associate of Applied Science (AAS), Associate of Arts (AA), and Associate of Science (AS) degrees with a focus on general education requirement for degree completion; AA and AS degrees are transferable to bachelor's degree programs at many colleges and universities. Diploma, certificate, and certificate of completion programs are also offered.

History 
DCB was founded in 1906 as the North Dakota State School of Forestry.  In 1968 the school then was affiliated with North Dakota State University and changed its name to North Dakota State University-Bottineau Branch.  In 1996 the school became affiliated with Minot State University, becoming Minot State University-Bottineau Campus.  It received its present name on August 1, 2009.

Admission 
DCB is an open enrollment campus to high school and GED graduates.

Athletics 
DCB's varsity athletic teams compete as the Lumberjacks (men's teams) and Ladyjacks (women's teams). DCB is part of the Mon-Dak Conference as part of the NJCAA. DCB athletic teams include Men's Baseball, Men's Basketball, Men's Ice Hockey, Women's Basketball, Women's Ice Hockey, Women's Fast-Pitch Softball and Women's Volleyball. The Dakota College at Bottineau Lumberjacks Ice Hockey men's ice hockey team has won the NJCAA National Championship 10 times.

Notable alumni 
 Dustin Penner, professional hockey player

See also 
 Old Main (Dakota College at Bottineau)

References

External links
Official website

Public universities and colleges in North Dakota
Educational institutions established in 1907
Buildings and structures in Bottineau County, North Dakota
Education in Bottineau County, North Dakota
1907 establishments in North Dakota
NJCAA athletics